The 40th Thailand National Games (Thai: การแข่งขันกีฬาแห่งชาติ ครั้งที่ 40 "ขอนแก่นเกมส์", also known as the 2011 National Games and the Khon Kaen Games) were held in Khon Kaen, Thailand from 3 to 13 March 2012 after being postponed by the 2011 Thailand floods, with competition in 39 sports and 77 disciplines. These games were held in Khon Kaen University Sport Center. Khon Kaen also hosted the 1992 Thailand National Games

Participating provinces

 
 
 
 
 
 
 
 
 
  
 
 
 
 
 
 
  (host)
 
 
 
 
 
 		
 
 Mukdahan
 
 
 
 
 
 
 
 
 Nong Bua Lamphu
 
 
 
 
 
 
 
 
 
 				
 
 
 
 
 
 
 
 
 
 
 
 
 
 
 
 
 
 
 
 		
 
  
 
 
 
 
 
 
 
 
 
 
 Yasothon

Sports

Air sports
Athletics
Badminton
Basketball
Billiards and snooker
Bodybuilding
Bowling
Bridge
Boxing
Cycling
Dancesport
Fencing
Field hockey
Football
Futsal
Gymnastics
Go
Golf
Handball
Judo
Kabaddi
Karate
Muay Thai
Petanque
Pencak silat
Rugby football
Sailing
Sepak takraw
Shooting
Swimming
Table tennis
Taekwondo
Tennis
Volleyball
Weightlifting
Woodball
Wrestling
Wushu

Demonstration sports
Jiu-Jitsu
Footvolley

Medal tally

National Games
Thailand National Games
National Games
Thailand National Games
National Games